Raúl Albiol Tortajada (born 4 September 1985) is a Spanish professional footballer who plays for La Liga club Villarreal and the Spain national team.

A reliable and physically strong player who excels in the air, his main asset is his versatility, as he can play as a centre-back, right-back or defensive midfielder. He spent most of his career with Valencia, Real Madrid and Villarreal, winning five major titles between the first two teams. He amassed La Liga totals of 328 matches and eight goals over 13 seasons, and also played several years in the Italian Serie A with Napoli.

A Spanish international since 2007, Albiol represented the country in two World Cups and as many European Championships, winning three tournaments including the 2010 World Cup.

Club career

Valencia
Born in Vilamarxant, Valencian Community, Albiol started playing football with two modest clubs in his native region, moving to local giants Valencia before celebrating his 10th birthday. He made his first-team debut on 24 September 2003 in a UEFA Cup first-round tie against AIK at 18 years and 20 days, but spent the first year still registered with the reserves.

In August 2004, whilst travelling to sign a deal to join Getafe on loan, Albiol was involved in a serious car accident, being put in intensive care. He managed to recover completely and, after reappearing in January, played an important role in the team surviving the relegation battle. He made his La Liga debut on 15 January 2005 in a 1–1 home draw with Atlético Madrid, and scored against another side from the capital, Real Madrid, in a 2–1 home win two months later.

Albiol returned to the Mestalla Stadium the following season, and quickly established himself as first-choice due to his versatility. In the opening game of 2006–07, he scored the winner against Real Betis in a 2–1 home victory. He also scored from long distance against Olympiacos on 12 September 2006 in the group stage of the UEFA Champions League, which Valencia won 4–2 away.

During his four-season spell with the first team, Albiol played at least 29 league games, and he helped to victory in the 2007–08 edition of the Copa del Rey.

Real Madrid

On 25 June 2009, Albiol joined Real Madrid for a fee thought to be in the region of €15 million, becoming the first Spanish player signed by Florentino Pérez upon his return to the presidency. He scored his first goal on 8 December in a 3–1 Champions League win away to Marseille. He was an undisputed starter during the league campaign, mainly due to Pepe's serious knee injury.

In the 2010–11 season, Albiol was relegated to the bench as Real brought in another player for his position, Ricardo Carvalho, only appearing in the league through injury or suspension to teammates; he did start, however, in the club's domestic cup run. On 26 January 2011, in the semi-final first leg against Sevilla (1–0 away victory), he cleared a Luís Fabiano shot just before it crossed the goal line. On 16 April, he was sent off for fouling former Valencia teammate David Villa inside the penalty area during El Clásico with Barcelona, which resulted in the first goal in a 1–1 league home draw.

On 6 August 2012, Albiol renewed his contract until June 2017. On 27 November, in his first appearance as captain, at home against Alcoyano in the Spanish Cup, he had to be stretchered off after only one minute, being sidelined for approximately one month with an ankle injury.

Napoli
On 21 July 2013, Albiol joined Napoli for a reported €12 million, signing a four-year contract. He made his Serie A debut on 25 August, in a 3–0 home win over Bologna.

Albiol scored his first goal for the Rafael Benítez-led team on 25 January 2014, with an 88th-minute equaliser in a 1–1 home draw against ChievoVerona. On 3 May, he played the entire final of the Coppa Italia, helping to a 3–1 defeat of Fiorentina.

Villarreal
On 4 July 2019, the 33-year-old Albiol returned to Spain after agreeing to a three-year deal with Villarreal. He made his debut on 17 August, in a 4–4 home draw with Granada.

Albiol scored twice from 11 appearances in the 2020–21 UEFA Europa League, as the club won the first major honour of its 98-year history. In the 2021 UEFA Super Cup against Chelsea, he missed the decisive penalty in the shoot-out.

International career

Having represented Spain at under-21 level, Albiol made his debut for the senior squad on 13 October 2007 in an UEFA Euro 2008 qualifier against Denmark, a 3–1 away win. In the final stages, he appeared twice for the eventual champions, against Sweden (subbing in for the injured Carles Puyol) and Greece.

New national team coach Vicente del Bosque included Albiol in the squad for the 2009 FIFA Confederations Cup in South Africa. He started in Spain's first game, partnering Puyol in central defence ahead of Valencia teammate Carlos Marchena and helping defeat New Zealand 5–0.

Albiol was picked for the 2010 FIFA World Cup, but did not leave the bench for the eventual champions after having suffered an injury in training. Again as an unused player, he was also in the squad for the Euro 2012 tournament in Poland and Ukraine, which also ended in victory.

Albiol was named in Spain's 23-man squad for the 2014 World Cup. He made his debut in a major finals in the last group match against Australia with the Spanish already eliminated, playing the whole 90 minutes alongside Sergio Ramos in central defence in a 3–0 victory.

Personal life
Albiol's nickname is "El Chori". His older brother Miguel was also a footballer, while his father, also named Miguel, appeared in the Segunda División for Sabadell. The youngest sibling, Brian, was named after Brian Laudrup, whom Raúl admired on account of his success with the Denmark national team.

Albiol fathered two daughters with his wife Alicia. In 2008, with Guillermo Franco and Marcos Senna, he founded Evangélico FC, an organisation consisting of 140 athletes and 16 coaches which sought to promote Christian values among young athletes in Spain.

Career statistics

Club

International

Honours
Valencia
Copa del Rey: 2007–08
UEFA Cup: 2003–04

Real Madrid
La Liga: 2011–12
Copa del Rey: 2010–11; runner-up: 2012–13
Supercopa de España: 2012

Napoli
Coppa Italia: 2013–14
Supercoppa Italiana: 2014

Villarreal
UEFA Europa League: 2020–21

Spain U19
UEFA European Under-19 Championship: 2004

Spain
FIFA World Cup: 2010
UEFA European Championship: 2008, 2012
FIFA Confederations Cup runner-up: 2013; third place 2009

Individual
La Liga Breakthrough Player of the Year: 2006
UEFA Europa League Squad of the Season: 2014–15, 2020–21

References

External links

CiberChe stats and bio 

1985 births
Living people
People from Camp de Túria
Spanish Protestants
Sportspeople from the Province of Valencia
Spanish footballers
Association football defenders
Association football midfielders
Association football utility players
La Liga players
Segunda División B players
Valencia CF Mestalla footballers
Valencia CF players
UEFA Cup winning players
Getafe CF footballers
Real Madrid CF players
Villarreal CF players
Serie A players
S.S.C. Napoli players
UEFA Europa League winning players
Spain youth international footballers
Spain under-21 international footballers
Spain international footballers
UEFA Euro 2008 players
2009 FIFA Confederations Cup players
2010 FIFA World Cup players
UEFA Euro 2012 players
2013 FIFA Confederations Cup players
2014 FIFA World Cup players
UEFA European Championship-winning players
FIFA World Cup-winning players
Spanish expatriate footballers
Expatriate footballers in Italy
Spanish expatriate sportspeople in Italy